The 2016 World Kabaddi Cup was the sixth edition of the circle style World Kabaddi Cup, held from 4 November to 17 November 2016 with the Opening Ceremony on 3 November 2016 at the Nehru stadium Roopnagar. The tournament took place in Punjab, India.

Organization
The tournament was organized by the Government of Punjab, India.

Participating nations
The 13 day event had 12 participating nations in the men's tournament, with 8 participating nations in the women's tournament.

Men's tournament

Venues
The games were played at the following venues.
 Government College Stadium, Gurdaspur
 Shaheed Kartar Singh Sarabha Sports Stadium, Sarabha, Ludhiana
 Sports Stadium, Attari, Amritsar
 Kabaddi Stadium, Moonak, Sangrur
 Kabaddi Ground, Begowal, Kapurthala
 Sports Stadium, Rode, Moga
 Sports Stadium, Adampur, Jalandhar
 Baba Kala Mehar Stadium, Barnala
 Guru Arjun Dev Sports Stadium, Chohla Sahib, Tarn Taran
 Govt. Ripudaman College Stadium, Nabha, Patiala
 Yadwindra Stadium, Mehraj, Bathinda
 Guru Gobind Singh Multipurpose Stadium, Badal, Bathinda
 Multipurpose Sports Stadium, Jalalabad, Fazilka

Opening and closing ceremonies
The opening ceremony was held on 3 November in the Evening at Nehru Stadium in Roopnagar. Gippy Grewal, Sharry Mann, Jaspinder Narula, Bharti Singh, Arjan Bajwa and Noora Sisters appeared at this event.

The closing ceremony was held on 17 November, before the final match at Multipurpose Sports Stadium, Jalalabad, Fazilka.

Controversy
In the first semi final on 15 Nov, several controversial decisions given in favor of England triggered some protest during the match by Iranian players. Eventually it was decided that match would go into extra time, in which England narrowly escaped with a 41–39 win. Iranian players were seen unhappy with the conclusion.

Schedule
Note: All matches' timings are according to Indian Standard Time (UTC +5:30)

Group stage

Pool A

 Qualified for semifinals

Pool B

 Qualified for semifinals

Knockout stage

Semi-finals

Third place

Final match

Women's tournament

Schedule
Note: All matches' timings are according to Indian Standard Time (UTC +5:30).

Group stage

Pool A

 Qualified for semifinals

Pool B

 Qualified for semifinals

Knockout stage

Semi-finals

Third place

Final match

Broadcasting 
Television

See also 
 2020 Kabaddi World Cup (Circle style)
 Kabaddi World Cup (Circle style)

References

External links 
 Official Facebook page

Kabaddi World Cup
2016 in Indian sport
Kabaddi competitions in India